"I'll Be Your Lover, Too" is a song written by Northern Irish singer-songwriter Van Morrison. It appears on the album His Band and the Street Choir, released in 1970.

Composition
Some have considered the music of the song similar to that on Morrison's second studio album Astral Weeks. The song is a moderate tempoed acoustic ballad in 4/4 time, with one 5/8 bar before the vocal comes in. The song is in the key of G major, with the chord progression of Em-C-Em-C-Em-C-D-D.

Personnel on original release
Van Morrisonguitar, vocal
John Klingbergbass guitar
John Plataniaguitar
Dahaud Shaar (David Shaw)drums

Notes

References
 Van Morrison Anthology, Los Angeles: Alfred Music Publishing, 1999, 
 Hinton, Brian (2000), Celtic Crossroads: The Art of Van Morrison, Sanctuary, 

Van Morrison songs
1970 songs
Songs written by Van Morrison
Song recordings produced by Van Morrison